Gardenieae is a tribe of flowering plants in the family Rubiaceae and contains about 586 species in 53 genera.

Genera 
Currently accepted names

 Adenorandia Vermoesen (1 sp)
 Agouticarpa C.H.Press. (7 sp)
 Aidia Lour. (55 sp)
 Aidiopsis Tirveng. (1 sp)
 Alleizettella Pit. (2 sp)
 Aoranthe Somers (5 sp)
 Atractocarpus Schltr. & K.Krause (29 sp)
 Aulacocalyx Hook.f. (12 sp)
 Benkara Adans. (19 sp)
 Brachytome Hook.f. (8 sp)
 Brenania Keay (2 sp)
 Bungarimba K.M.Wong (4 sp)
 Calochone Keay (2 sp)
 Casasia A.Rich (10 sp)
 Catunaregam Wolf (12 sp)
 Ceriscoides (Hook.f.) Tirveng. (11 sp)
 Coddia Verdc. (1 sp)
 Deccania Tirveng. (1 sp)
 Dioecrescis Tirveng. (1 sp)
 Duperrea Pierre ex Pit. (1 sp)
 Euclinia Salisb. (3 sp)
 Fosbergia Tirveng. & Sastre (4 sp)
 Ganguelia Robbr. (1 sp)
 Gardenia J.Ellis (134 sp)
 Gardeniopsis Miq. (1 sp)
 Genipa L. (3 sp)
 Heinsenia K.Schum. (1 sp)
 Himalrandia T.Yamaz. (2 sp)
 Hyperacanthus E.Mey. ex Bridson (11 sp)
 Kailarsenia Tirveng. (6 sp)
 Kochummenia K.M.Wong (2 sp)
 Larsenaikia Tirveng. (3 sp)
 Macrosphyra Hook.f. (3 sp)
 Massularia (K.Schum.) Hoyle (1 sp)
 Morelia A.Rich ex DC. (1 sp)
 Oligocodon Keay (1 sp)
 Oxyceros Lour. (12 sp)
 Phellocalyx Bridson (1 sp)
 Pleiocoryne Rauschert (1 sp)
 Porterandia Ridl. (23 sp)
 Preussiodora Keay (1 sp)
 Pseudaidia Tirveng. (1 sp)
 Pseudomantalania J.-F.Leroy (1 sp)
 Randia L. (101 sp)
 Ridsdalea
 Rosenbergiodendron Fagerl. (4 sp)
 Rothmannia Thunb. (42 sp)
 Rubovietnamia Triveng. (2 sp)
 Schumanniophyton Harms (3 sp)
 Singaporandia (Hook.f.) K.M.Wong (1 sp)
 Sphinctanthus Benth. (8 sp)
 Tamilnadia Tirveng. & Sastre (1 sp)
 Tarennoidea Tirveng. & Sastre (2 sp)
 Tocoyena Aubl. (19 sp)
 Vidalasia Tirveng. (5 sp)

Synonyms

 Anamanthodia Hook.f. = Aidia
 Angusta J.Ellis = Gardenia
 Assidora A.Chev. = Schumanniophyton
 Basanacantha Hook.f. = Randia
 Bergkias Sonn. = Gardenia
 Buttneria P.Browne = Casasia
 Canthopsis Miq. = Catunaregam
 Caquepiria J.F.Gmel. = Gardenia
 Ceriscus Gaertn. = Catunaregam
 Chalazocarpus Hiern = Schumanniophyton
 Conosiphon Poepp. = Sphinctanthus
 Cupia (Schult.) DC. = Aidia
 Decameria Welw. = Gardenia
 Dorothea Wernham = Aulacocalyx
 Fagerlindia Tirveng. = Benkara
 Foscarenia Vell. ex Vand. = Randia
 Franciella Guillaumin = Atractocarpus
 Griffithia Wight & Arn. = Benkara
 Gynopachis Blume = Aidia
 Lachnosiphonium Hochst. = Catunaregam
 Lepipogon G.Bertol. = Catunaregam
 Narega Raf. = Catunaregam
 Neofranciella Guillaumin = Atractocarpus
 Pelagodendron Seem. = Aidia
 Piringa Juss. = Gardenia
 Plastolaena Pierre ex A.Chev. = Schumanniophyton
 Pleimeris Raf. = Gardenia
 Polycoryne Keay = Pleiocoryne
 Pseudixora Miq. = Aidia
 Pseudogardenia Keay = Adenorandia
 Sahlbergia Neck. = Gardenia
 Stylocoryna Cav. = Aidia
 Stylocoryne Wight & Arn. = Aidia
 Sukunia A.C.Sm. = Atractocarpus
 Sulipa Blanco = Gardenia
 Sulitia Merr. = Atractocarpus
 Tetrastigma K.Schum. = Schumanniophyton
 Thunbergia Montin = Gardenia
 Trukia Kaneh. = Atractocarpus
 Ucriana Willd. = Tocoyena
 Varneria L. = Gardenia
 Warneria J.Ellis = Gardenia
 Xeromphis Raf. = Catunaregam
 Yangapa Raf. = Gardenia

References

External links 
 
 
 World Checklist of Rubiaceae

 
Ixoroideae tribes